Slaughter Hotel, also known as Asylum Erotica and Cold Blooded Beast, is a 1971 Italian giallo horror film directed by Fernando Di Leo and starring Klaus Kinski. The film follows a masked killer murdering the wealthy female inmates of a sanitorium.  The building that was used as the mental hospital in this film was used several years earlier as the set for the 1966 giallo The Murder Clinic.

Plot
A hooded, axe-wielding killer lurks around a large rural villa which has been converted into an asylum. It begins when a woman named Ruth is committed to the clinic by her husband. She attempts to escape by assaulting an orderly as well as attempting suicide, but is restrained. One of the residents, named Cheryl, is visited by her husband, Mr. Hume, who had committed her because of a suicide attempt due to her stressful job working as head of their company. Mr. Hume talks with the clinic director Dr. Francis Clay and his associate, Dr. Austin, about the possibility of Cheryl being cured. Dr. Clay tells Mr. Hume that Cheryl's suicidal urges may relapse once she is released, but Hume thinks that his wife only needs some more rest at the clinic.

Meanwhile, Helen is a nurse who is tending to resident Mara, who tells Nurse Helen that she seems to be improving with her treatment. Another patient is Anne, who is a diagnosed nymphomaniac. Anne attempts to follow the gardener to seduce him, but she is called back to her room by Dr. Austin, who counsels her about her "impulsive" and "excessive" sexual desires. Anne is visited by her brother, Peter, and wants them to return to the 'affectionate' ways they together had as children, and clearly has sexual feelings for him. Peter says they must resist this now they are adults.

Later that evening, as the attendants and patents sit in a room to mingle and play cards and board games, Anne sneaks out the front door and runs to the greenhouse. The hooded and cloaked person is outside, and after a nurse walks by (seeing and ignoring the person), she is beheaded with a scythe.

Anne sees the gardener, takes off all her clothes, approaches him, and seduces him into having sex with her in the greenhouse. Meanwhile, Helen goes to Mara's room and tells her that she can join the others if she wants and says that she will check on her later. Dr. Austin is told that Anne is missing, and the attendants go to find her. After having sex with Anne, the gardener tells her that she must leave for he will suffer the consequences of their tryst. Anne does not want to leave, so the gardener smacks her. Anne hits him back, calmly puts her clothes back on and leaves. She walks over and kisses the male attendants that find her until Austin calls her to stop. Meanwhile, Cheryl asks Dr. Clay if she will be like she was before, and the doctor tells her that she has been cured.

The killer goes back inside the clinic, gets a knife, and unlocks Ruth's door as she sleeps. The killer takes off his hood and Ruth awakens and she goes for the killer with the knife, but she gets knocked aside and the killer then chokes her and stabs Ruth in the chest.

Dr. Austin looks around the hallway with a flashlight and finds Nurse Helen, who says that she heard a noise. A chauffeur enters the building and drinks all of the drinks left over from the get-together. After looking around, the killer shows up and murders the chauffeur by pushing him into an iron-maiden-esque device, and his blood pours out. The killer next walks around with a sword and angrily hits on the bed in Cheryl's empty room. Cheryl meets with Dr. Clay in the hallway and they leave together. Dr. Clay and Cheryl talk of their potential relationship, and he leaves to "do the rounds."

While Nurse Helen enters Mara's room and clearly attempts to seduce her while Mara is taking a bath, the killer walks into Anne's room while she sleeps, shuts her window, and takes off his hood. Anne's eyes open, she sees the killer standing over her bed and asks him to lie down next to her. The killer chooses instead to axe her to a bloody death.

Back in Mara's room, she dances a bit for Helen to a song on the radio. As Mara looks out of her window, the killer fires a crossbow, hitting her in the neck with an arrow, killing her instantly. Helen screams, and a crowd gathers outside her door. Austin and Clay see the dead woman, and Austin tells an attendant not to let anyone in the room. The two doctors and Cheryl look around the building when they find blood on the antique weapons and discover the chauffeur's body. Clay points out that the other sword from the display is missing, and Austin finally calls the police, stating to the police commissioner that the killer is still inside the clinic.

The police and medical attendants remove the bodies of Anne, Ruth, Mara, and the other nurse from the area, but they are angry that Dr. Austin moved some weapons and tried to keep the killings a secret, thus making him an accessory after-the-fact. The police inspector suggests using Cheryl as bait, and Dr. Clay tries to get her to rethink the idea after she agrees to it.

While all the other clinic patients are moved into a single room for their own protection, Cheryl awaits in her room. The killer approaches with a rope to strangle where he removes his hood... finally revealing himself to be her husband, Hume. The police detectives show up before he can finish strangling Cheryl and chase Hume around the building. Clay and Austin theorize that Cheryl's husband wanted to kill his wife for some time and he created the idea of a maniac spree killer so that no one would suspect him of Cheryl's murder. Hume knocks out two of the cops chasing him and upon running into a room to hide, discovers all of the clinic's female nurses in it. Hume goes on a brutal killing spree, killing every woman in the room before the police run in and finally shoot Hume dead.

Cast
 Klaus Kinski as Dr. Francis Clay
 Margaret Lee as Cheryl Hume
 Rosalba Neri as Anne Palmieri
 Jane Garret as Mara
 John Karlsen as Professor Osterman
 Gioia Desideri as Ruth
 John Ely as Gardener
 Fernando Cerulli as Augusto, the chauffeur
 Sandro Rossi
 Giulio Baraghini as Policeman
 Ettore Geri as Inspector
 Antonio Radaelli
 Monica Strebel as Nurse Helen
 Carla Mancini as Nurse

Release
The film was released theatrically in the United States by Hallmark Releasing and American International Pictures in 1972 under the titles Slaughter Hotel and Asylum Erotica, where it was usually shown on double and triple bills with other Hallmark/AIP releases such as Twitch of the Death Nerve and Don't Look in the Basement. There is also a version released in France under the title Les insatisfaites poupées érotiques du docteur Hitchcock containing explicit sexual scenes. The film was released on DVD by Media Blasters on their sub-label Shriek Show in 2004.

Reception
In a contemporary review, David McGillivray reviewed a dubbed 74 minute version of the film titled Cold Blooded Beast in the Monthly Film Bulletin. McGillivray found the film to be a "curde and mertricious Italian murder mystery" with "a great many killings (all clumsily presented without a trace of suspense) are interspersed with regular doses of sex, and the director has an annoying habit of regurgitating a good percentage of the footage each time a character recalls a past event."

References

External links

1971 films
1971 horror films
1970s slasher films
Italian erotic horror films
Erotic slasher films
Giallo films
1970s Italian-language films
Italian slasher films
Films directed by Fernando Di Leo
1970s Italian films